The Women's Giant Slalom in the 2019 FIS Alpine Skiing World Cup involved 8 events. 

The battle for the discipline championship was waged between two skiers better known for their slalom prowess: Mikaela Shiffrin of the United States and Petra Vlhová of Slovakia.  With only the World Cup finals in Soldeu on 17 March remaining, both women had posted three victories in the discipline to distance themselves from the two most recent champions in the discipline, Tessa Worley of France and Viktoria Rebensburg of Germany. But Shiffrin's two other podium finishes, which Vlhová couldn't match, had staked Shiffrin to a 97-point lead over Vlhová, which meant that all Shiffrin needed to do in the finals was finish in the top 15 (since only the top 15 score points in the finals). Instead, Shiffrin actually won the finals to decisively eliminate Vlhová, who finished third in the race. 

The season was interrupted by the 2019 World Ski Championships, which were held from 4–17 February in Åre, Sweden. The women's giant slalom was held on 14 February.

Standings

DNF1 = Did Not Finish run 1
DSQ1 = Disqualified run 1
DNQ = Did not qualify for run 2
DNF2 = Did Not Finish run 2
DSQ2 = Disqualified run 2
DNS = Did Not Start

See also
 2019 Alpine Skiing World Cup – Women's summary rankings
 2019 Alpine Skiing World Cup – Women's Overall
 2019 Alpine Skiing World Cup – Women's Downhill
 2019 Alpine Skiing World Cup – Women's Super-G
 2019 Alpine Skiing World Cup – Women's Slalom
 2019 Alpine Skiing World Cup – Women's Combined

References

External links
 Alpine Skiing at FIS website

Women's Giant Slalom
FIS Alpine Ski World Cup women's giant slalom discipline titles